Coconut Grove is a northern suburb of the city of Darwin, Northern Territory, Australia within the local government area of City of Darwin.

History
Coconut Grove is named for the grove of coconuts on the coastal fringe of the area. Development of Coconut Grove dates back to the pre-war years when it was mainly used for farming, but the suburb primarily grew from the 1960s.

Coconut Grove is a small residential and light industrial suburb. Coconut Grove is bounded by Progress Drive in the north, Bagot Road in the east, Totem Road in the south and the Darwin Harbour foreshore in the west. Most streets in Coconut Grove are named after local Darwin residents, interstate visitors and crew who died during the shipwreck of the SS Gothenburg off the Queensland coast in 1875.

Coconut Grove is usually associated with the adjacent northern Darwin suburbs of Nightcliff, Millner and Rapid Creek.

References

External links

https://web.archive.org/web/20070903185425/http://www.brmanagement.com.au/suburbsmap.html
https://web.archive.org/web/20080123190745/http://www.nt.gov.au/lands/lis/placenames/origins/greaterdarwin.shtml#c
https://web.archive.org/web/20080116181605/http://203.84.234.220/Profile/Darwin/Default.aspx?id=146

Suburbs of Darwin, Northern Territory